Traian Neagu (born 3 January 1987, Rosiorii de Vede, Telorman, Romania) is a Romanian sprint canoeist. At the 2012 Summer Olympics, he competed in the Men's K-4 1000 metres, finishing in 8th place in the final.

References

Romanian male canoeists
Living people
Olympic canoeists of Romania
Canoeists at the 2012 Summer Olympics
1987 births